Antonio Ney Latorraca (born 27 July 1944, in Santos) is a Brazilian actor.

Biography

Ney Latorraca was born in the port city of Santos, São Paulo state, to Alfredo, a casino crooner, and Nena, a showgirl who performed in casinos. Actor Grande Otelo was his godfather, and he grew up in an artistic environment. Two years after his birth, casinos were forbidden in Brazil by a presidential decree, and his family thus lost their primary means of survival. As a result, his parents decided to move to São Paulo. His mother became a house wife and his father got a job at Rádio Record.

Latorraca started his acting career early. At six, he made an appearance on a radio series by Rádio Record. At nine, he made his first appearance on a TV programme, in the miniseries Alô, Doçura by Rede Tupi. In 1957 his family moved to Rio de Janeiro, where he continued his studies.

In 1964, Ney took part on his first play, "Pluft, O Fantasminha" written by Maria Clara Machado and directed by Serafim Gonzales. From that moment on, he decided that he would be a famous actor. His first professional opportunity came in the next year, when he was selected to join the cast of the play Reportagem de um Tempo Mau, a criticism of the military dictatorship that was ruling the country. The play was presented only once, being subsequently banned by the Federal Censorship and the whole cast arrested for a few days. Soon after, Latorraca moved back to Santos and participated in several amateur plays with the theatre group of the Faculty of Philosophy of Santos.

Beginning in 1967, Latorraca attended the University of São Paulo's School of Dramatic Art for 3 years, graduating as the first of his class. Marília Pêra was the godmother of his graduating class.

From 1968 on, Ney Latorraca participated in numerous plays, telenovelas and movies. In 1979 he performed alongside his godfather Grande Otelo in the musical play Lola Moreno. In the telenovela Um Sonho a Mais, Latorraca interpreted five different characters, including a woman. Some of his most memorable roles are the playboy Mederiquis in the soap opera Estúpido Cupido (1976), the polygamous Quequé in the miniseries Rabo de Saia (1984), and the old man Barbosa, in the comic series TV Pirata (1988).

In November 1986 he premiered with Marco Nanini one of the most successful plays in Brazilian history, O Mistério de Irma Vap, directed by Marília Pêra. The play was staged for 11 consecutive years and watched by more than 2.5 million people, setting a Brazilian record included in the Guinness Book. The play originated a motion picture, Irma Vap – O Retorno (2006), also interpreted by the two actors.

Latorraca has been in a same-sex relationship for over 20 years with fellow actor Edi Botelho.

Works

Television 
 1968 – Beto Rockfeller
 1969 – Super Plá
 1972 – Quero Viver
 1972 – Dom Camilo e Seus Cabeludos
 1972 – Eu e a Moto
 1973 – Vidas Marcadas
 1973 – Venha Ver o Sol na Estrada 
 1974 – Escalada – Felipe
 1975 – O Grito – Sérgio 
 1976 – Estúpido Cupido  – Mederix 
 1977 – Sem Lenço, sem Documento – Marco
 1978 – Saudade Não Tem Idade
 1978 – Dancin' Days
 1979 – Malu Mulher
 1979 – Plantão de Polícia
 1979 – Aplauso, Como Matar um Playboy
 1980 – O Bem Amado
 1980 – Chega Mais – Jonas
 1980 – Coração Alado – Leandro Serrano
 1982 – Caso Verdade, O Menino dos Milagres – Antoninho da Rocha Marmo
 1982 – Elas por Elas – Porteiro do motel
 1982 – Avenida Paulista – Sérgio
 1983 – Eu Prometo – Albano
 1984 – Anarquistas, Graças a Deus – Ernesto Gattai 
 1984 – Rabo de Saia – Quequé 
 1984 – Partido Alto – Escadinha
 1985 – Grande Sertão: Veredas – Father Ponte 
 1985 – Um Sonho a Mais – Antônio Carlos Volpone/Anabela Freire/Augusto Melo Sampaio/Dr. Nilo Peixe/André Silva
 1986 – Memórias de um Gigolô – Esmeraldo 
 1988 – TV Pirata – Barbosa
 1990 – Brasileiras e Brasileiros – Brás Cubas
 1991 – Vamp – Vlad 
 1994 – Éramos Seis – Sorriso Tavinho
 1995 – Casa do Terror
 1997 – Zazá – Silas Vadan
 1999 – Você Decide, Madame Sussu
 2000 – O Cravo e a Rosa – Cornélio Valente 
 2001 – Brava Gente, O Automóvel
 2002 – Sítio do Picapau Amarelo – Baron Munchausen
 2002 – O Beijo do Vampiro – Nosferatu
 2003 – A Casa das Sete Mulheres – Araújo Ribeiro 
 2004 – Da Cor do Pecado – Eduardo Campos Sodré (Edu)
 2005 – Bang Bang – Aquarius Lane
 2007 – O Sistema – Nicolas Katedref 
 2007 – Faça Sua História – Pai Creuzo 
 2008 – Casos e Acasos, A Escolha, a Operação e a Outra – Walmor
 2008 – Negócio da China – Edmar Silvestre
 2010 – S.O.S. Emergência – Dr. Solano
 2011 – A Grande Família – Fred Marques
 2013 –  Alexandre e Outros Heróis – Alexandre

Cinema 
 1969 – Audácia: A Fúria dos Desejos
 1973 – A Noite do Desejo – Toninho
 1974 – Sedução
 1976 – Deixa Amorzinho... Deixa – Dino/Dalma 
 1976 – Anchieta, José do Brasil – Anchieta 
 1978 – O Grande Desbum
 1979 – Uma Estranha História de Amor – Daniel
 1981 – O Beijo no Asfalto – Arandir
 1982 – Heart and Guts – priest
 1984 – A Mulher do Atirador de Facas 
 1985 – Ópera do Malandro – Tigrão 
 1986 – Ele, o Boto – Rufino
 1987 – A Fábula da Bela Palomera – Orestes
 1989 – Festa – Ator 
 1994 – Dente Por Dente
 1995 – Brevíssimas Histórias da Gente de Santos
 1995 – Carlota Joaquina, Princess of Brazil – Jean-Baptiste Debret
 1996 – For All – o Trampolim da Vitória
 2001 – Minha Vida em Suas Mãos – Analyst
 2003 – Viva Sapato! – Claudionor
 2004 – O Diabo a Quatro – Senator Heitor Furtado 
 2006 – Irma Vap – o Retorno – Darci/Odete Lopes 
 2009 – Topografia de Um Desnudo – Manoel

Theater 
 1965 – Reportagem de Um Tempo Mau
 1970 – Hair
 1972 – Jesus Christ Superstar
 1973 – Bodas de Sangue
 1975 – A Mandrágora
 1983 – King Lear
 1986/97 – The Mystery of Irma Vep
 1994 – O Médico e o Monstro
 1995 – Don Juan
 1996 – Quartett
 1999 – O Martelo
 2000 – 3 x Teatro
 2011 – A Escola do Escândalo
 2022 – Seu Neyla

Awards 

São Paulo Association of Art Critics (APCA)
Troféu APCA (1984) (Best television actor)
Contigo! Magazine
Contigo! Award (1998) (Best vilain, as Silas Vadan in Zazá)

References

External links 

 

1944 births
People from Santos, São Paulo
Brazilian LGBT actors
Brazilian male actors
Brazilian people of Italian descent
Living people